The 1919 Wellington City mayoral election was part of the New Zealand local elections held that same year. In 1919, elections were held for the Mayor of Wellington plus other local government positions including fifteen city councillors. The incumbent Mayor John Luke retained office for a fourth consecutive term. The polling was conducted using the standard first-past-the-post electoral method.

Mayoralty results

Councillor results

Notes

References

Mayoral elections in Wellington
1919 elections in New Zealand
Politics of the Wellington Region
1910s in Wellington